The Milwaukee Brewers served as a replacement team late in the 1884 Union Association (UA) season.  Called the Cream Citys by both local newspapers, they had a record of 8–4. The team came to the UA from the Northwestern League, as did the St. Paul Saints, and were managed by Tom Loftus. They played their home games at the Wright Street Grounds.

Although their season was brief, it was highlighted by a 5–0 no-hitter tossed by Ed Cushman on September 28 and an 18-strikeout game by Henry Porter on October 3.

The Brewers joined the new Western League for the 1885 season before folding and being replaced by a separate Milwaukee Brewers team that played the following year in the Northwestern League.

1884 season
The 1884 Milwaukee Brewers were a replacement team in the Union Association, joining the league from the Northwestern League along with the St. Paul Saints. They played their first game on September 27, going 8–4 to finish the season with the second-best winning percentage in the league, behind only the league champion St. Louis Maroons. This was the only season this version of the team existed, and indeed the only season the Union Association existed.

Season standings

Record vs. opponents

Roster

Player stats

Batting

Starters by position 
Note: Pos = Position; G = Games played; AB = At bats; H = Hits; Avg. = Batting average; HR = Home runs

Other batters 
Note: G = Games played; AB = At bats; H = Hits; Avg. = Batting average; HR = Home runs

Pitching

Starting pitchers 
Note: G = Games pitched; IP = Innings pitched; W = Wins; L = Losses; ERA = Earned run average; SO = Strikeouts

References

Union Association baseball teams
Northwestern League teams
Defunct Western League teams
Baseball teams established in 1884
Sports clubs disestablished in 1885
1884 establishments in Wisconsin
1885 disestablishments in Wisconsin
Professional baseball teams in Wisconsin
Baseball in Milwaukee
Defunct baseball teams in Wisconsin
Baseball teams disestablished in 1885